The Art of Worldly Wisdom is a book written in 1647 by Baltasar Gracián y Morales, better known as Baltasar Gracian. It is a collection of 300 maxims, each with a commentary, on various topics giving advice and guidance on how to live fully, advance socially, and be a better person, that became popular throughout Europe.

It was translated by Joseph Jacobs (London and New York City, Macmillan and co., 1892.  Other editions are also available from:

Nayika, 2009, ; edited with a light commentary/footnotes
Shambhala Publications, 2004, 
Christopher Maurer (Doubleday) 1992
Dover Publications, 2005, 
Google Books as a free digital edition via partnership with Princeton University Library

References

External links
A page dedicated to The Art of Worldly Wisdom at Internet Sacred Text Archive
 
Partial Translation of El Arte de Prudencia
 Complete Translation (from 1705) digitized on the website of the Hispanic digital library (National Library of Spain)
Reflections about Aphorisms from The Art of Worldly Wisdom, blog by Ricardo del Pino.

Philosophy books
Self-help books
1647 books